Calcutta Girls' College, established in 1963, is a women's undergraduate college in Kolkata, West Bengal, India. It is affiliated with the University of Calcutta.

Departments

Science

Mathematics
Philosophy
Political Science

Arts and Commerce

Bengali
English
Hindi
Urdu
History
Political Science
Economics
Education
Commerce
Accounts

Accreditation
In 2007 the college has been accredited C++ by the National Assessment and Accreditation Council (NAAC).
Calcutta Girls' College is recognized by the University Grants Commission (UGC).

See also 
List of colleges affiliated to the University of Calcutta
Education in India
Education in West Bengal

References

External links

Educational institutions established in 1963
University of Calcutta affiliates
Universities and colleges in Kolkata
Women's universities and colleges in West Bengal
1963 establishments in West Bengal